Montivipera raddei or Armenian viper is a species of viper, a venomous snake in the subfamily Viperinae of the family Viperidae. The species is endemic to Armenia, Azerbaijan, Iran, Turkey, and possibly also Iraq. Two subspecies are recognized.

Etymology
The specific name, raddei, is in honor of German naturalist Gustav Radde.

Common names
Common names for M. raddei include rock viper, Radde's mountain viper, Kurdistan viper (Vipera raddei kurdistanica), Armenian mountain viper, Armenian viper, Radde's viper, Armenian mountain adder, and Zanjhani viper.

Description

Geographic range
Montivipera raddei is found in Eastern Turkey, northwestern Iran, Armenia, Azerbaijan, and probably Iraqi Kurdistan. This species is parapatric or slightly sympatric with M. wagneri in the Aras river valley, Kars Province, eastern Turkey.

The type locality is listed as "Kasikoparan in Armenien ". According to Nilson and Andrén (1986), Kasikoparan, Armenia (40°02'N, 43°26'E) is now part of Turkey (Kazikkiran [Kazikkoparan]), Tuzluca, Kars Province, northeastern Anatolia).

Conservation status
Montivipera raddei is classified as Lower Risk with a subcategory of least concern (LR/lc) according to the IUCN Red List of Threatened Species (v2.3, 1994). This indicates that it has been evaluated, but that it does not satisfy the criteria for any of the categories Critically Endangered, Endangered or Vulnerable. Also, it does not qualify for Conservation Dependent or Near Threatened either. Year assessed: 1996.

It is, however, listed as a protected species (Appendix III) under the Berne Convention.

Taxonomy
Montivipera raddei is apparently closely related to Montivipera r. albicornuta and M. latifii; together they sometimes form the Montivipera raddei complex. There are two subspecies: the nominate from Armenia, Azerbaijan, eastern Turkey, northwest Iran, and adjacent Turkmenistan, and M. r. kurdistanica from southeast Turkey and adjacent Iraq and Iran.

References

Further reading

Boettger O (1890). "Eine neue Viper aus Armenien ". Zoologischer Anzeiger 13: 62-64. ("Vipera Raddei n. sp."). (in German).
Boulenger GA (1896). Catalogue of the Snakes in the British Museum (Natural History). Volume III., Containing the ... Viperidæ. London: Trustees of the British Museum (Natural History). (Taylor and Francis, printers). xiv + 727 pp. + Plates I-XXV. ("Vipera raddii [sic]", p. 487).
Latifi, Mahmoud (1991). The Snakes of Iran. Oxford, Ohio: Society for the Study of Amphibians and Reptiles. 167 pp. . (Vipera raddei, Zanjhani viper, p. 134). 
Nilson G, Andrén C (1986). "The mountain vipers of the middle east: The Vipera xanthina complex". Bonner Zoologische Monographien 20: 1-90.

External links

 Vipera (Montivipera) raddei raddei at Checklist of Armenia's Amphibians and Reptiles, Tadevosyan's Herpetological Resources. Accessed 20 August 2016.

raddei
Reptiles of Western Asia
Reptiles described in 1890